NetworkX is a Python library for studying graphs and networks. NetworkX is free software released under the BSD-new license.

Features 
 Classes for graphs and digraphs.
 Conversion of graphs to and from several formats.
 Ability to construct random graphs or construct them incrementally.
 Ability to find subgraphs, cliques, k-cores.
 Explore adjacency, degree, diameter, radius, center, betweenness, etc.
 Draw networks in 2D and 3D.

Suitability 
NetworkX is suitable for operation on large real-world graphs: e.g., graphs in excess of 10 million nodes and 100 million edges. Due to its dependence on a pure-Python "dictionary of dictionary" data structure, NetworkX is a reasonably efficient, very scalable, highly portable framework for network and social network analysis.

Integration 
NetworkX is integrated into SageMath.

See also 

 Social network analysis software
 JGraph

References

External links
 Official website: 
 NetworkX discussion group
 Survey of existing graph theory software
 NetworkX on StackOverflow
 

Free mathematics software
Free software programmed in Python
Graph drawing software
Numerical software
Software using the BSD license
Python (programming language) scientific libraries